Fear Street Part Two: 1978 (titled onscreen as Fear Street 1978) is a 2021 American teen supernatural slasher film directed by Leigh Janiak, with a script co-written by Janiak and Zak Olkewicz, from an original story by Janiak, Olkewicz and Phil Graziadei. Based on the book series of the same name by R. L. Stine, it is the second installment in the Fear Street trilogy after Part One: 1994 and stars Sadie Sink, Emily Rudd, Ryan Simpkins, McCabe Slye, Ted Sutherland, Gillian Jacobs, Kiana Madeira, Benjamin Flores Jr. and Olivia Scott Welch. The film centers on a group of teenagers in Camp Nightwing who must come together to survive a possessed counselor's murder spree.

Produced by Chernin Entertainment, a film adaptation of Fear Street began development at 20th Century Fox in 2015, with Janiak hired in 2017. Filming for the trilogy took place back-to-back from March to September 2019 in Georgia, with the intention of a theatrical release beginning June 2020. However, due to the COVID-19 pandemic and the acquisition of 21st Century Fox by Disney, Chernin Entertainment ended their distribution deal with 20th Century Studios and sold rights to Netflix in August 2020.

Fear Street Part Two: 1978 premiered at the Los Angeles State Historic Park on July 8, 2021, and was released by Netflix on July 9, 2021. The film received generally positive reviews from critics, who praised the screenplay, direction and the performances of Sink, Rudd and Simpkins. The final installment in the trilogy, Part Three: 1666, was released on July 16.

Plot
In 1994, Deena and Josh Johnson restrain Sam, Deena's girlfriend who is possessed, and travel to C. Berman's house for help. Initially reluctant, Berman allows them inside and begins recounting the events of the Camp Nightwing massacre.

On July 19, 1978, Ziggy Berman from Shadyside is accused of stealing by Sheila, a Sunnyvale camper, and her friends. They accuse her of being a witch and in retaliation, hang her from a tree and burn her arm with a lighter before camp counselors Nick Goode and Kurt intervene. Ziggy's older sister, Cindy, and her boyfriend Tommy Slater are cleaning the mess hall when Nurse Lane, the mother of Ruby Lane, attacks Tommy, but he overpowers her and she is later removed from camp by police. The teenagers from Sunnyvale believe she was possessed by Sarah Fier, as was her daughter. While investigating the infirmary, Cindy and Tommy encounter counselors Alice, Cindy's former friend, and her boyfriend Arnie. They find Lane's diary which says that Fier made a deal with the devil by cutting off her hand on Satan's stone, thereby earning eternal life. They also find a map in the diary leading to Fier's house.

At the house, they find empty graves dug up by Nurse Lane and discover the witch's mark below the house. Alice and Cindy find a wall carved with the names of all the Shadyside killers and Tommy's name included. Tommy, now possessed, kills Arnie with an axe, and the girls escape into a cave. At camp, Nick helps Ziggy prank Sheila and lock her in the outhouse. As the two bond and share a kiss, Tommy reaches the camp and murders several Shadyside campers, including counselor Joan. Meanwhile, Cindy and Alice try to escape using the witch's mark in the diary as a map of the cave. They soon come across a pile of beating organs and when Alice touches it, it shows her flashbacks of all the past killers and their victims. After Alice injures her leg, she reconciles with Cindy and the two reach a cave opening beneath the outhouse.

After fighting an angry Sheila and knocking her unconscious, Ziggy and counselor Gary try to rescue Alice and Cindy until Tommy decapitates Gary. Ziggy hides with Nick until he is injured by Tommy and escapes to the mess hall. As the rest of the camp leaves via bus, Cindy finds a route to the mess hall while Alice stays behind. Tommy attacks Ziggy, but Cindy intervenes and kills him. Alice arrives and tells them that she found the witch's hand. She had started bleeding and realized that she was sitting near Satan's stone, where she dug it out.

The trio decides to end the curse by reuniting Sarah's hand with the body. Ziggy suddenly bleeds on the hand and sees a vision of Sarah Fier. This triggers the curse, resurrecting several Shadyside killers. A reanimated Tommy kills Alice before Cindy decapitates him. Ziggy and Cindy run to the tree where Fier was hanged, with the Shadyside killers in pursuit. They dig around the tree, only to find a rock with the words “The witch forever lives” carved. When Cindy realizes the killers are after Ziggy, she drops the hand and sacrifices herself. The two are murdered and the killers disappear. Nick later finds them and saves Ziggy via CPR.

Back in 1994, Deena and Josh realize that C. Berman is Ziggy, whose real name is Christine. They tell her that they found the witch's body and now, with the hand, they can end the curse. Deena and Josh go to Shadyside Mall, which was built after the closure of Camp Nightwing, and dig out the hand from under the same tree. They take it to the place where the body is buried and Deena reunites the body with the hand. Deena's nose bleeds and she finds herself back in 1666, where she is now Sarah Fier.

Cast

Production
On October 9, 2015, it was announced that a film based on Stine's Fear Street series was being developed by 20th Century Studios (then known as 20th Century Fox before its acquisition by Disney) and Chernin Entertainment. Screenwriter Zak Olkewicz was hired to write the script for the second film while Kyle Killen and Silka Lusia were assigned to Part One and Part Three respectively. In July 2017, Leigh Janiak was hired to lead the project, directing and rewriting the films. Janiak oversaw a writers room with her writing partner, Phil Graziadei. In January 2019, Alex Ross Perry was slated to direct the second installment. By March of that year, Perry stepped down, and Janiak was confirmed as directing all three films, a trilogy set in different time periods, and shot back-to-back, with the intention of releasing the films one month apart.

In April 2019, Gillian Jacobs, Sadie Sink, Emily Rudd and McCabe Slye joined the cast. In March 2019, filming had begun on the first film in Atlanta and East Point, Georgia. Production also took place at Hard Labor Creek State Park in Rutledge in August 2019. Despite being the second film of the trilogy, 1978 was the last of the three films to be shot. Filming wrapped in September 2019.

Release
The first film of the trilogy was scheduled to be released theatrically in June 2020, but it was pulled from the schedule because of the COVID-19 pandemic. In April 2020, Chernin Entertainment ended their distribution deal with 20th Century Studios and made a multi-year first-look deal with Netflix. By August 2020, Netflix had acquired the distribution rights to the Fear Street trilogy.  The film premiered at the Los Angeles State Historic Park on July 8, 2021 before it was released on Netflix on July 9, 2021.

Reception
The website's critics consensus states, "A smart and subversive twist on slasher horror, Fear Street Part II: 1978 shows that summer camp has never been scarier thanks to stellar performances from Sadie Sink, Emily Rudd, and Ryan Simpkins." According to Metacritic, which assigned a weighted average score of 61 out of 100 based on 16 critics, the film received "generally favorable reviews."

Natalia Winkelman, in her review of the Fear Street trilogy for The New York Times, described 1978 as being the strongest film in the trilogy, and wrote: "the change in scenery ensures that "Part Two" never feels like a clone of "Part One."" Writing for Empire, Ian Freer gave the film a score of 3 stars out of 5, writing: "It might not work as well as Part One: 1994, but it cements the idea that telling a narrative in feature-length instalments ... can be a fruitful mode for ambitious long-form storytelling", but stated: "As the plot splits the teens up, there is little of the engaging interplay between the friends of the first part and, with only one type of maniac on the loose, the kills themselves feel same-y, less imaginative."

Lovia Gyarkye of The Hollywood Reporter described the film as being "its own exhilarating adventure that showcases a dynamic cast of characters and revels in lots and lots of bloody murder." She concluded: "For me, the best parts of Fear Street Part 2 are the ones in which the teen drama takes center stage — from the illicit romantic pairings to the crazy feuds and pranks. Genre purists will be relieved that none of that comes at the expense of grisly murder scenes; Janiak spares no one, and there’s no shortage of inventive deaths." Kevin Maher of The Times gave the film a score of 3 stars out of 5, writing: "As with the first outing, the director Leigh Janiak proves herself an impeccable stylist, delivering muted 1970s tones, judiciously judged scares and ceaseless tap-a-long tunes".

Nick Allen of RogerEbert.com gave the film a score of 2 out of 4 stars. He wrote that the "hacking is top-notch", and praised the score by Marco Beltrami and Brandon Roberts, but concluded that the film is "a frustrating bummer—a summer camp slasher that’s afraid of campiness, and one that’d be a better fit for group therapy sessions than sleepovers." Barry Hertz of The Globe and Mail wrote: "While Part One stands as a fine-enough ode to the slasher renaissance of the mid-1990s ... Part Two proves that the entire Fear Street enterprise could have easily kept its time-hopping ambitions to a two-hour kill fest", adding: "the big and bloody problem with Part Two is that, by making a horror flick set at a 1970s summer camp with a contemporary perspective and budget, director Leigh Janiak has set herself up for failure."

Sequel

The trilogy continues with Part Three: 1666, which was released on July 16, 2021.

Notes

References

External links
 
 

Fear Street
2021 films
2021 horror films
2020s slasher films
2020s teen horror films
American sequel films
American slasher films
American teen horror films
20th Century Studios films
Chernin Entertainment films
English-language Netflix original films
Films about summer camps
The Devil in film
Films about spirit possession
Films about curses
Films about witchcraft
Films not released in theaters due to the COVID-19 pandemic
Films scored by Marco Beltrami
Films set in 1978
Films set in 1994
Films shot in Atlanta
Films shot in Georgia (U.S. state)
Films about sisters
2020s English-language films
Films directed by Leigh Janiak
2020s American films